The EMD SD18 is a 6-axle diesel locomotive built by General Motors Electro-Motive Division between April 1960 and March 1963. Power was provided by an EMD 567D1 16-cylinder engine which generated .

54 examples of this locomotive model were built for American railroads, and 60 for export, including fifteen for Korail (order numbers 700735–700749, serial numbers 28373–28387).

Design and Production 
The SD18 was the third model in EMD's SD (special duty) line of locomotives. It was designed as a modified GP18 which had six axles instead of four. The additional axles allowed for more tractive effort and a more even distribution of weight compared to the GP18.

Original Owners

Preservation 
At least four SD18s have been preserved. Chop-nosed Duluth, Missabe & Iron Range 193 is now an operating member of the Lake Superior Railroad Museum collection. They also previously had DM&IR 316 in their collection, which is an "SDM"; an EMD SD18 given EMD 645 power assemblies by the Missabe, though still labeled as an SD18. In 2019 #316 was traded for Northern Pacific #245 and left the museum for the Dakota Quality Grain Corporation in Parshall, N.D. As of March 2022 grain terminal operator AgRail LLC of Bloomington, Illinois has acquired Western Rail Inc. SD18M No. 1229 through a lease-to-purchase agreement. The unit began service with Minnesota's Reserve Mining in May 1961 and was last used by the Western Milling plant in Goshen, CA. It was rewired in the 1980s.

References

External links 
 

SD18
C-C locomotives
Diesel-electric locomotives of the United States
Railway locomotives introduced in 1960
Freight locomotives
Standard gauge locomotives of the United States
Standard gauge locomotives of South Korea
Diesel-electric locomotives of South Korea